Hawaii High School Athletic Association (HHSAA) is made up of 95 public and private high schools in the state of Hawaii. HHSAA was founded in 1956. It is a member of the National Federation of State High School Associations.

The HHSAA comprises schools from five leagues:

Big Island Interscholastic Federation 
Interscholastic League of Honolulu 
Kauai Interscholastic Federation 
Maui Interscholastic League 
Oahu Interscholastic Association

The HHSAA conducts state high school championships in the following sports: boys and girls air riflery, baseball, boys and girls basketball, boys and girls bowling, boys and girls and coed canoe paddling, cheerleading, boys and girls cross country, football, boys and girls golf, boys and girls judo, boys and girls soccer, softball, boys and girls swimming and diving, boys and girls tennis, boys and girls track and field, boys and girls volleyball, girls water polo, and boys and girls wrestling.

See also
HHSAA State Football Championships/Oahu Prep Bowl
 NFHS

External links
 Official website

High school sports associations in the United States
Hawaii high school athletic conferences
Sports organizations established in 1956
1956 establishments in Hawaii